Hetman of Zaporizhian Cossacks is a historical term that has multiple meanings.

Officially the post was known as Hetman of the Zaporizhian Host (Het'man Viys'ka Zaporoz'koho). Hetman of Zaporizhian Cossacks as a title was not officially recognized internationally until the creation of the Cossack Hetmanate. With the creation of Registered Cossacks units their leaders were officially referred to as Senior of His Royal Grace Zaporozhian Host (Starshyy Yoho Korolivs'koyi Mylosti Viys'ka Zaporoz'koho). Before 1648 and the establishment of the Cossack Hetmanate there were numerous regional hetmans across the Dnieper-banks, who usually were starostas or voivodes.

The first widely recognized hetman of Zaporizhia was Dmytro Vyshnevetsky, after that several Polish starostas were added to the Hetman registry such as Lanckoroński and Daszkiewicz who also led their own cossack formations. According to Mykola Hrushevsky they were not really considered as hetman, at least by their contemporaries. Among other such starostas were Karpo Maslo from Cherkasy, Yatsko Bilous (Pereyaslav), Andrushko (Bratslav), and many others. Even Princes Konstanty Ostrogski and Bohdan Hlinski were conducting Cossack raids on Tatar uluses (districts).

The commanders of Zaporozhian Host (the Kosh) often considered as hetmans in fact carried a title of Kosh Otaman. As from 1572, hetman was the unofficial title of commanders of the Registered Cossack Army of the Polish–Lithuanian Commonwealth. From the 1648 Bohdan Khmelnytsky uprising, Hetman was the title of the head of the Cossack state, the Cossack Hetmanate. Cossack hetmans had very broad powers and acted as supreme military commanders and executive leader (by issuing administrative decrees).

After the split of Ukrainian territory along the Dnieper River by the Polish-Russian Treaty of Andrusovo 1667, there was an introduction of dual leadership for each bank, or for each Ukraine of Dnieper (left and right). After the Treaty of Andrusovo there existed two different Cossack Hetmanates with two Hetmans the one in Poland being called Nakazny Hetman of His Royal Mercy of Zaporizhian Host and the Russian one titled Hetman of His Tsar's Mercy of Zaporizhian Host.

Eventually the official state powers of Cossack Hetmans were gradually diminished in the 18th century, and finally abolished by Catherine II of Russia in 1764.

Cossack leaders
 Przecław Lanckoroński (1506–1512), not an actual hetman, he was a starosta of Khmilnyk
 Ostap Dashkevych (1506–1536), not an actual hetman, he was a starosta in charge of a defense force approved by the Sejm near Cherkasy. Dashkevych offered to create a defense force on the banks of the Lower Dnieper
 Dmytro Vyshnevetsky (1550–1564), first who created a Cossack garrison at the Nyz Dnieprovski (Lower Dnieper) on the island of Small Khortytsia in 1552
 Bohdan Ruzhynsky, member of Volhynia princedom, a leader who was sponsored by Moscow
 Ivan Svirgovsky (1567–1574)
 Ivan Pidkova (1577–1578), leader
 Ivan Orishevsky (1579–1591)
 Bogdan Mikoshinsky (1586–1594)
 Kryshtof Kosynsky (1591–1593), otaman led the 1590 uprising after Janusz Ostrogski confiscated his lands near Bila Tserkva that were awarded to him by the Sejm
 Hryhory Loboda (1593–1596), Hetman of Zaporizhia
 Severyn Nalyvaiko (1596), an Ostrogski recruit who fought against the Kosiński Uprising, led his own uprising in Podolie and Volhynia independent from Hryhory Loboda
 Lubny massacre, a massacre that was conducted by the Polish army led by Hetman Zolkiewski. After that battle the Cossack movement was greatly reduced within the Polish–Lithuanian Commonwealth
 Krempski, Hetman of Zaporizhia, was elected during the siege near Lubny and later managed to escape with a small number of other cossacks
 Vasylevych, Hetman of Zaporizhia
 Nechkovsky, Hetman of Zaporizhia
 Tykhin Baybuza (1597–1598), Hetman of Zaporizhia
 Samiylo Kishka (1599–1601), Hetman of Zaporizhia, managed to reinstate the rights of cossacks in the Polish–Lithuanian Commonwealth
 Petro Konashevych-Sahaidachny led successful campaigns against the Tatars and the Turks, aided the Polish army at Moscow in 1618 and at the Battle of Khotyn in 1621. He also saw Cossack interests in the independence of Ukraine from Poland.
 Mykhailo Doroshenko (1623–1628)
 Hryhoriy Chorny (1628–1630), elected by Registered Cossacks
 Taras Fedorovych (1629–1630), elected by unregistered Cossacks
 Ivan Sulyma (1630–1635)
 Ivan Petrizhitsky-Kulaga (1631–1632)
 Tomilenko (1635–1637)
 Savva Kononovych (1637), former Pereyaslav polkovnyk
 Pavel Mikhnovych, better known as Pavel Pavluk, the leader of 1637 uprising
 Karp Skydan, Pavlyuk's assistant, headed the 1637 uprising while Pavlyuk returned to Zaporizhia
 Battle between Moshny and Ros on 6 December 1637
 Ilyash Karaimovych (1637), Mykola Potocki's appointee of Registered Cossacks, Bohdan Khmelnytsky was appointed a pysar of Karaimovych.
 Dmytro Hunia (1638), leader in Zaporizhia

Hetmans of Cossack Hetmanate

Historians such as Mykola Arkas question legitimacy of the Teteria's elections accusing the later in corruption. Also some sources claim election of Teteria being taken place in January 1663. The election of Teteria led to the Povoloch Regiment Uprising in 1663, followed by bigger number of unrest in the modern region of Kirovohrad Oblast as well as Polesie (all in the Right-bank Ukraine). Moreover, the political crisis that followed the Pushkar–Barabash Uprising divided the Cossack Hetmanate completely on both bank of Dnieper River. Coincidentally, on 10 January 1663, the Tsardom of Muscovy created the new Little Russian Office (Prikaz) within its Ambassadorial Office.

Vouched by Charles Marie François Olier, marquis de Nointel, Yuriy Khmelnytsky was freed from the Ottoman captivity, appointed and along with Pasha Ibragim was sent to Ukraine fight the Moscow forces of Samoilovych and Romadanovsky. In 1681 Mehmed IV appointed George Ducas the Hetman of Ukraine, replacing Khmelnytsky.

Following the anathema on Mazepa and the election of Ivan Skoropadsky, Cossack Hetmanate was included into the Russian Government of Kiev in December 1708. Upon the death of Skoropadsky, the Hetman elections were disrupted and were awarded as a gift and a type of princely titles, first to Moldavian nobleman and later to the Russian Empress favorite.

On 5 April 1710 the council of cossacks, veterans of the battle at Poltava, elected Pylyp Orlyk as the Hetman of Ukraine in exile. Orlyk waged a guerrilla warfare at the southern borders of the Russian Empire with the support from Ottoman and Swedish empires.

Tsardom of Russia appointed hetmans
 Ivan Bezpaly, elected by some cossacks in the town of Varva
 Demian Mnohohrishny, "Siverian Hetman"

Polish appointed hetmans
The Appointed Hetman Mykhailo Khanenko was elected the Hetman of Ukraine by a council of Sukhoviy's Cossacks in Uman to depose Doroshenko. In 1675 John III Sobieski awarded the title to some Ostap Hohol (died in 1679). Same thing happened in 1683 when John III Sobieski awarded the title to Stefan Kunicki and in 1684 to Andriy Mohyla. Those awards were given during the Great Turkish War.

 Pavlo Teteria
 Mykhailo Khanenko, appointment confirmed by the King of Poland Michal Korybut Wisniowiecki
 Ostap Hohol, appointment confirmed by the King of Poland John III Sobieski
 Stefan Kunicki, appointment confirmed by the King of Poland John III Sobieski
 Andriy Mohyla, appointment confirmed by the King of Poland John III Sobieski
 Samiylo Samus, title surrendered to Ivan Mazepa

Sanjak-bey, Prince of Sarmatia (Turkish appointments)
In 1669 Petro Doroshenko received a title of Sanjak-bey from Mehmed IV. Title existed in 1669 to 1683.

 Petro Doroshenko
 Yuri Khmelnytsky
 George Ducas

Hetman in exile
The title existed in 1710–1760.
 Pylyp Orlyk
 Hryhor Orlyk

See also 
 Bulawa
 Hetmans of the Polish–Lithuanian Commonwealth
 Kosh otaman
 History of Cossacks
 Zaporizhian Host
 Zaporizhian Sich
 List of Ukrainian rulers
 Taras Bulba

Notes

References

External links 
 Encyclopedia of Ukraine

 
Military history of the Polish–Lithuanian Commonwealth
Hetmans of Ukrainian Cossacks
Ukraine history-related lists
Cossack Hetmanate
Military ranks of Ukraine
Hetmans of Ukrainian Cossacks